Hochdahl station is a through station in the district of Hochdahl of the town of Erkrath in the German state of North Rhine-Westphalia. It has two platform tracks and it is classified by Deutsche Bahn as a category 5 station.

History
The station was opened with the section of the Düsseldorf–Elberfeld railway from Erkrath to Wuppertal-Vohwinkel built by the Düsseldorf-Elberfeld Railway Company on 10 April 1841. The line between Erkrath and Hochdahl has a gradient of 3.33% and rises 82 m in about 2.5 km. For more than one hundred years, this was the steepest main line in Europe. For many years trains had to be hauled by cable, originally driven by a stationary steam engine. A few months later, haulage by cable attached to a stationary steam engine was changed to haulage by cable attached via pulleys; to a locomotive running downhill on an additional track. With the duplication of the remainder of the line in 1865, the steep section of line became three-track, until the electrification of the line in 1963. The third track was rebuilt in 1985, as part of the additional third track built for the planned S-Bahn line. In 1926, cable haulage on the incline was replaced by bank engines.

Services
The station is served by Rhine-Ruhr S-Bahn lines S 8 between Mönchengladbach and Wuppertal-Oberbarmen or Hagen every 20 minutes and several S 68 services between Wuppertal-Vohwinkel and Langenfeld in the peak hour.

It is also served by two bus routes operated by Rheinbahn every 20–60 minutes: O5 and 741.

References

Rhine-Ruhr S-Bahn stations
S8 (Rhine-Ruhr S-Bahn)
Railway stations in Germany opened in 1841
1841 establishments in Prussia
Buildings and structures in Mettmann (district)